Ata Yamrali  (born 5 July 1982) is a German-Afghan footballer who plays as an attacking midfielder for German lower-league club SC Alstertal/Langenhorn. Between 2007 and 2013 he made 12 appearances for Afghanistan national team scoring 3 goals.

Club career
Yamrali was born in Kabul.

International career
Yamrali was a member of the Afghanistan national team and appeared in two 2010 FIFA World Cup qualifying matches. He scored his first international goal for Afghanistan in 2008 AFC Challenge Cup qualifiers against the hosts, Kyrgyzstan, to ensure Afghanistan qualified for the finals.

Career statistics

Club

International goals
Scores and results list Afghanistan's goal tally first, score column indicates score after each Yamrali goal.

References

1982 births
Living people
Afghan footballers
Footballers from Kabul
Afghan emigrants to Germany
Association football midfielders
Afghanistan international footballers
FC St. Pauli II players
VfL 93 Hamburg players